The White House Iftar dinner is an annual reception held at the White House and hosted by the U.S. President and the First Lady to celebrate the Muslim month of Ramadan. The annual tradition started in 1996 when Hillary Clinton hosted a Ramadan Eid celebration dinner. The modern iteration of the reception is attended by prominent members of the Muslim American community including politicians, community leaders and students.

Thomas Jefferson held the first White House dinner (not an Iftar dinner) with a Muslim while hosting Sidi Soliman Mellimelli, an envoy of Beylik of Tunis, on December 9, 1805. Jefferson adjusted the timing of the meal to after sunset to accommodate Sidi Soliman Mellimelli's Ramadan tradition.

Annual receptions

President Bill Clinton continued the tradition, as did George W. Bush who hosted an iftar dinner at the White House in 2001. Bush subsequently continued the dinners every year of his two terms. Barack Obama hosted his first Ramadan dinner in 2009, and subsequently every year of his presidency.

In 2017, Donald Trump broke the two decade old White House tradition by opting not to host an Iftar dinner at the White House. Donald Trump reestablished the Iftar dinner tradition at the White House on June 6, 2018 and in 2019 the White House held the Iftar dinner on May 13, 2019.

See also
 White House Passover Seder
 List of dining events

References

Iftar foods
White House
Islam in Washington, D.C.
Dining events
Food and drink in Washington, D.C.